This list of mammals of Lebanon comprises 107 mammal species recorded in Lebanon, of which one is critically endangered, two are endangered, seven are vulnerable, and one is near threatened.

The following tags are used to highlight each species' conservation status as assessed by the IUCN Red List:

Order: Artiodactyla (even-toed ungulates) 

The even-toed ungulates are ungulates whose weight is borne about equally by the third and fourth toes, rather than mostly or entirely by the third as in perissodactyls. There are about 220 artiodactyl species, including many that are of great economic importance to humans.
Family: Bovidae (cattle, antelope, sheep, goats)
Subfamily: Antilopinae
Genus: Gazella
Mountain gazelle, G. gazella 
Family: Cervidae (deer)
Subfamily: Capreolinae
Genus: Capreolus
Roe deer, C. capreolus 
Subfamily: Cervinae
Genus: Cervus
Red deer, C. elaphus 
Family: Suidae (pigs)
Subfamily: Suinae
Genus: Sus
Wild boar, S. scrofa

Order: Carnivora (carnivorans) 

There are over 260 species of carnivorans, the majority of which feed primarily on meat. They have a characteristic skull shape and dentition.
Suborder: Feliformia
Family: Felidae (cats)
Subfamily: Felinae
Genus: Caracal
Caracal, C. caracal 
Genus: Felis
Jungle cat, F. chaus 
African wildcat, F. lybica 
Family: Herpestidae (mongooses)
Genus: Herpestes
Egyptian mongoose, H. ichneumon 
Family: Hyaenidae (hyaenas)
Genus: Hyaena
Striped hyena, H. hyaena 
Suborder: Caniformia
Family: Canidae (dogs, foxes)
Genus: Canis
Golden jackal, C. aureus 
Syrian jackal, C. a. syriacus
Grey wolf, C. lupus 
Arabian wolf, C. l. arabs 
Genus: Vulpes
Red fox, V. vulpes 
Family: Ursidae (bears)
Genus: Ursus
Brown bear, U. arctos 
Syrian brown bear, U. a. syriacus
Family: Mustelidae (mustelids)
Genus: Lutra
Eurasian otter, L. lutra 
Genus: Martes
Beech marten, M. foina 
Genus: Meles
Caucasian badger, M. canescens 
Genus: Mellivora
Honey badger, M. capensis 
Genus: Mustela
Least weasel, M. nivalis 
Genus: Vormela
Marbled polecat, V. peregusna 
Family: Phocidae (earless seals)
Genus: Monachus
Mediterranean monk seal, M. monachus  possibly extirpated

Order: Cetacea (whales) 

The order Cetacea includes whales, dolphins and porpoises. They are the mammals most fully adapted to aquatic life with a spindle-shaped nearly hairless body, protected by a thick layer of blubber, and forelimbs and tail modified to provide propulsion underwater.

Species listed below also includes species being recorded in Levantine Sea except for gray whale.
Suborder: Mysticeti
Family: Balaenopteridae
Genus: Balaenoptera
 Blue whale, Balaenoptera musculus EN (possible)
 Fin whale, Balaenoptera physalus EN
 Common minke whale, Balaenoptera acutorostrata LC 
Subfamily: Megapterinae
Genus: Megaptera
Humpback whale, M. novaeangliae 
Family: Balaenidae
Genus: Eubalaena
 North Atlantic right whale, Eubalaena glacialis CR (possible)
Suborder: Odontoceti
Family: Physeteridae (sperm whales)
Genus: Physeter
 Sperm whale, Physeter macrocephalus VU
Family: Ziphiidae (beaked whales)
Genus: Hyperoodon
 Northern bottlenose whale, Hyperoodon ampullatus LC
Genus: Mesoplodon
 Blainville's beaked whale, Mesoplodon densirostris DD
Genus: Ziphius
 Cuvier's beaked whale, Ziphius cavirostris LC
Genus: Mesoplodon
 Gervais' beaked whale, Ziphius cavirostris DD
Family: Delphinidae (oceanic dolphins)
Genus: Delphinus
 Short-beaked common dolphin, Delphinus delphis LC
Genus: Grampus
 Risso's dolphin, Grampus griseus LC
Genus: Pseudorca
 False killer whale, Pseudorca crassidens DD
Genus: Stenella
 Striped dolphin, Stenella coeruleoalba LC
 Pantropical spotted dolphin, Stenella attenuata LR/cd (possible)
Genus: Sousa
 Indo-Pacific humpback dolphin, Sousa chinensis DD
Genus: Steno
 Rough-toothed dolphin, Steno bredanensis LC
Genus: Tursiops
 Common bottlenose dolphin, Tursiops truncatus LC
Genus: Grampus
 Risso's dolphin, Grampus griseus LC
Genus: Orcinus
 Orca, Orcinus orca DD
Genus: Pseudorca
 False killer whale, Pseudorca crassidens DD
Genus: Globicephala
 Long-finned pilot whale, Globicephala melas DD

Order: Chiroptera (bats) 

The bats' most distinguishing feature is that their forelimbs are developed as wings, making them the only mammals capable of flight. Bat species account for about 20% of all mammals.
Family: Pteropodidae (flying foxes, Old World fruit bats)
Subfamily: Pteropodinae
Genus: Rousettus
 Egyptian fruit bat, R. aegyptiacus 
Family: Vespertilionidae
Subfamily: Myotinae
Genus: Myotis
Lesser mouse-eared bat, M. blythii 
Long-fingered bat, M. capaccinii 
Geoffroy's bat, M. emarginatus 
Greater mouse-eared bat, M. myotis 
Whiskered bat, M. mystacinus 
Natterer's bat, M. nattereri 
Subfamily: Vespertilioninae
Genus: Eptesicus
 Serotine bat, Eptesicus serotinus
Genus: Hypsugo
 Savi's pipistrelle, Hypsugo savii
Genus: Nyctalus
 Common noctule, Nyctalus noctula
Genus: Pipistrellus
 Kuhl's pipistrelle, Pipistrellus kuhlii LC
 Common pipistrelle, Pipistrellus pipistrellus LC
Genus: Plecotus
 Grey long-eared bat, Plecotus austriacus
Subfamily: Miniopterinae
Genus: Miniopterus
Common bent-wing bat, M. schreibersii 
Family: Molossidae
Genus: Tadarida
European free-tailed bat, T. teniotis 
Family: Nycteridae
Genus: Nycteris
 Egyptian slit-faced bat, Nycteris thebaica LC
Family: Rhinolophidae
Subfamily: Rhinolophinae
Genus: Rhinolophus
 Mediterranean horseshoe bat, Rhinolophus euryale VU
 Greater horseshoe bat, Rhinolophus ferrumequinum
 Lesser horseshoe bat, Rhinolophus hipposideros LC

Order: Erinaceomorpha (hedgehogs and gymnures) 

The order Erinaceomorpha contains a single family, Erinaceidae, which comprise the hedgehogs and gymnures. The hedgehogs are easily recognised by their spines while gymnures look more like large rats.
Family: Erinaceidae (hedgehogs)
Subfamily: Erinaceinae
Genus: Erinaceus
 Southern white-breasted hedgehog, E. concolor 
Genus: Hemiechinus
 Long-eared hedgehog, H. auritus

Order: Hyracoidea (hyraxes) 

The hyraxes are any of four species of fairly small, thickset, herbivorous mammals in the order Hyracoidea. About the size of a domestic cat, they are well-furred, with rounded bodies and a stumpy tail. They are native to Africa and the Middle East.
Family: Procaviidae (hyraxes)
Genus: Procavia
 Cape hyrax, P. capensis

Order: Lagomorpha (lagomorphs) 

The lagomorphs comprise two families, Leporidae (hares and rabbits), and Ochotonidae (pikas). Though they can resemble rodents, and were classified as a superfamily in that order until the early 20th century, they have since been considered a separate order. They differ from rodents in a number of physical characteristics, such as having four incisors in the upper jaw rather than two.
Family: Leporidae (rabbits, hares)
Genus: Lepus
Cape hare, L. capensis 
European hare, L. europaeus

Order: Rodentia (rodents) 

Rodents make up the largest order of mammals, with over 40% of mammalian species. They have two incisors in the upper and lower jaw which grow continually and must be kept short by gnawing.
Suborder: Hystricomorpha
Family: Hystricidae
Genus: Hystrix
Indian crested porcupine, H. indica 
Suborder: Sciurognathi
Family: Sciuridae (squirrels)
Subfamily: Sciurinae
Tribe: Sciurini
Genus: Sciurus
 Caucasian squirrel, S. anomalus 
Subfamily: Xerinae
Tribe: Marmotini
Genus: Spermophilus
 Asia Minor ground squirrel, Spermophilus xanthoprymnus
Family: Gliridae (dormice)
Subfamily: Leithiinae
Genus: Dryomys
 Forest dormouse, Dryomys nitedula
Genus: Eliomys
 Asian garden dormouse, Eliomys melanurus LC
Family: Spalacidae
Subfamily: Spalacinae
Genus: Nannospalax
 Palestine mole rat, Nannospalax ehrenbergi LC
Family: Cricetidae
Subfamily: Cricetinae
Genus: Cricetulus
 Grey dwarf hamster, Cricetulus migratorius
Genus: Mesocricetus
 Turkish hamster, Mesocricetus brandti
Subfamily: Arvicolinae
Genus: Microtus
 Günther's vole, Microtus guentheri
 Persian vole, Microtus irani
 Social vole, Microtus socialis
Family: Muridae (mice, rats, voles, gerbils, hamsters)
Subfamily: Gerbillinae
Genus: Gerbillus
 Wagner's gerbil, Gerbillus dasyurus
Genus: Meriones
 Tristram's jird, Meriones tristrami
Subfamily: Murinae
Genus: Apodemus
 Persian field mouse, Apodemus arianus
 Yellow-necked mouse, Apodemus flavicollis
 Broad-toothed field mouse, Apodemus mystacinus
Genus: Mus
 House mouse, Mus musculus
Genus: Rattus
Brown rat, R. norvegicus  introduced

Order: Soricomorpha (shrews, moles, and solenodons) 

The "shrew-forms" are insectivorous mammals. The shrews and solenodons closely resemble mice while the moles are stout-bodied burrowers.
Family: Soricidae (shrews)
Subfamily: Crocidurinae
Genus: Crocidura
 Bicolored shrew, C. leucodon 
Lesser white-toothed shrew, C. suaveolens 
Genus: Suncus
 Etruscan shrew, S. etruscus

Locally extinct 
The following species are locally extinct in the country:
Cheetah, Acinonyx jubatus
Hartebeest, Alcelaphus buselaphus
Wild goat, Capra aegagrus
Nubian ibex, Capra nubiana
Persian fallow deer, Dama mesopotamica
Onager, Equus hemionus
Lion, Panthera leo
Leopard, Panthera  pardus

See also
Wildlife of Lebanon
List of chordate orders
Lists of mammals by region
Mammal classification

References

External links

Lebanon
Lebanon
Mammals
Mammals